Frederick Joseph Foote (January 21, 1924 – June 30, 1999) was an American film and television actor. He is perhaps best known for playing the title role in the television series Steve Canyon.

Born in Los Angeles, California. Fredericks served in World War II and was awarded the Purple Heart medal. He began his acting career in 1952 with an appearance in the television series The Living Bible. Fredericks continued appearing on film and television in the mid-1950s under the stage name Norman Fredric.

In 1955 Fredericks starred in the television series Jungle Jim in the role of Kaseem. In 1958 he starred in the title role of the short-lived television series Steve Canyon, changing his name to Dean Fredericks. He also starred in the role of Captain Frank Chapman in the 1961 film The Phantom Planet. He retired from acting in 1965.

Fredericks died in June 1999 of cancer in Los Angeles, California, at the age of 75.

References

External links 

Rotten Tomatoes profile

1924 births
1999 deaths
People from Los Angeles
Male actors from Los Angeles
Deaths from cancer in California
American male film actors
American male television actors
20th-century American male actors
Western (genre) television actors
Male Western (genre) film actors
American military personnel of World War II
United States Army soldiers
Purple Heart